The Ruwenzori lampeye (Platypanchax modestus) is a species of poeciliid fish native to the Democratic Republic of the Congo and Uganda. It is found along lake shores and in the inflows of rivers.

References

Poeciliidae
Fish of the Democratic Republic of the Congo
Fish of Uganda
Freshwater fish of Africa
Fish described in 1914
Taxonomy articles created by Polbot